Uut is the chemical symbol of Ununtrium, the former name of a chemical element now called Nihonium (Nh).

UUT can also refer to:
 Unit under test, a manufactured product undergoing testing
 Upper urinary tract
 Upper urothelial tumours
 Urmia University of technology, a university in Iran